Slo-Mo is short for slow motion, a filmmaking technique. It may also refer to:

 Mike Brenner, a Philadelphia musician
 SloMo (Chanel song)
 "Slo Mo", a song by Cutterpillow